Acheilognathus tabira nakamurae is a subspecies of Acheilognathus tabira.

Named in honor of Morizumi Nakamura (1914-1998), for his contributions to the systematics of Japanese bitterlings.

References

Acheilognathus